Miroslav Hubmajer (original name Friedrich Hubmayer, 3 January 1851 – 1 March 1910) was a Slovenian officer and volunteer in the Herzegovina Uprising.

Miroslav Hubmajer was born in Ljubljana. Trained as a mailman, he worked in Egypt and Sudan. During military service in the Austrian army, he received the rank of reserve lower officer. His interest in studying mechanics led him to apply for several patents. After military service he started working for the National Printing House (Narodna Tiskarna) in Ljubljana. The workers at that time were well organized, informed, and educated and Hubmajer joined their organization. A lot of printworkers volunteered in the Herzegovina uprising including Hubmajer, who went to Herzegovina in May 1876. 
At the assembly of rebels in Jamnica he was elected against Peter Mrkonjić (later Serbian King Petar I. Karadjordjević) for chief commander of all rebel troops although he was not recognized as leader of adherents of Peter Mrkonjić. The Turks launched a high reward for his head. In the Serbo-Turkish war he joined the Serbian army, became artillery officer and then later fled with Nikola Pašić to Bucharest, where he founded a lithographic institute. Later he got a job in Belgrade and was editor Belgrader Zeitung. Together with Vasa Pelagić in 1884 he writes the declaration for the Balkan-Karpathian federation. In 1896 he got a job in the regional museum in Sarajevo as an expert adviser for the Austro-Hungarian ministry of finance and administrator of the Condominium of Bosnia and Herzegovina, Beni Kallay.

Miroslav Hubmajer from Ljubljana, or "Black Miroslav," as he was called by the rebels, was best known among all Slovenian volunteers in Herzegovina Uprising. He served as an artillery NCO in Segedin, where he became acquainted with the Serbs. He was by profession a typesetter, and when he was 24 years old he joined the Herzegovina Uprising, where he soon acquired a reputation as a hero. Stories about his military achievements were circulating among the people of Bosnia and Herzegovina and they were covered in European newspapers.

Hubmajer's first military activities were around Trebinje in Herzegovina. Later he travelled with Kosta Grujić to Montenegro as a delegate of the uprising movement to Montenegrin prince Nikola to gain support in the war against the Turks. The duke Vrbič, Minister of the Interior, kindly accepted them and presented them to all the nobility and guests on the Montenegrin court. In recognition of his merits in the struggle against the Turks he received from Duke Vrbič a gun belt and 60 bullets.  Later he was sent to Una region in Bosnia to start, organize and command the uprising in that region. Meanwhile, it has been recognized by rebels that individual troops cannot achieve strategic success in battle against the Turks. 85 rebel leaders gathered in Jamnica, west of Una, to elect a chief commander and determine the battle plan. Peter Mrkonjić was at this assembly and some suggested that he became the chief commander   because he was the grandson of Karadjordje  and he bravely fought in the French army against the Prussians and proved his heroism in battle on the River Loire. But volunteers at the assembly were not in accordance; the small majority were supporters of Prince Milan of Serbia, on the opposite side were also supporters of Peter Mrkonjić, who were in the minority, and few supporters of Austria. Among the latter the leading role was played by Peter Uzelac, who had joined some of the followers of the Prince of Milan and this way he succeeded to prevent the election of Peter Mrkonjić for the main leader. Thus, for the head of the rebels, Miroslav Hubmajer was selected. As commander he led fierce battles near Jamnica and tried to take the Kostajnica. When it failed, he successfully led his army to attack the Turkish troops in Topola, two hours away from Jamnica. Under the influence of this victory the rebels swore an oath to the flag that they will fight to the end rather than to admit defeat and suffer the Turkish dominion.

When Serbia declared war on Turkey in 1876, Hubmajer participated in the fighting at Javor and Deligrad. Russian general Mikhail Chernyayev, who came with volunteers from Russia to help Serbia and became the chief commander of the Serbian army, raised him to the rank of lieutenant because of his abilities.

Hubmajer died on 1 March 1910 in Sarajevo.

References

Serbian people of Slovenian descent
1851 births
1910 deaths
Military personnel from Ljubljana
Austrian soldiers
Serbian–Turkish Wars (1876–1878)
Foreign volunteers in Serbian armies